In some countries, certain universities have a tradition of pairing their residential colleges or houses with one another. Colleges that are paired are referred to as sister colleges, and have a ceremonial and symbolic relationship to one another. Some notable pairs include Harvard University and Yale University, the University of Oxford and the University of Cambridge, and the University of York and Durham University. Students at one college can often find accommodation at their sister college should they be visiting the other University; this is especially relevant to Harvard and Yale students during the annual Game.

Ireland
Secondary schools in Ireland which are run by the same religious order are often referred to as "sister colleges" and enjoy a privileged relationship with one another. For example, the Jesuit Belvedere College and Clongowes Wood College are sister colleges, as are the Spiritan Blackrock College and St. Michael's College, Dublin.

See also
 Harvard-Yale sister colleges
 List of Oxbridge sister colleges
Seven Sisters (colleges), a group of American women's colleges

References 

Academic terminology
Harvard University
Yale University
Terminology of the University of Oxford
Terminology of the University of Cambridge
Oxbridge